Qalaat Tannour (also known as Qalaat et Tannoûr) is a Shepherd Neolithic archaeological site located halfway between Britel and Haour Taala,  southwest of Baalbek in the Baalbek District of the Beqaa Governorate in Lebanon.

The surface site was discovered by  M. Besançon in 1966 on a hill of exposed limestone rocks. It was the furthest south of all of the Shepherd Neolithic sites catalogued at the time. Flint tools found at the location were generally in a brown or grey, some showing a white patina. Blade types were typically short but also included thin and backed varieties, steep-scrapers and cores. The material was stored with the Saint Joseph University, Museum of Lebanese Prehistory.

Several Roman tombs were also noted at the site.

References

External links
 Qalaat et Tannoûr on geographic.org
 

Archaeological sites in Lebanon
Baalbek District
Great Rift Valley
Beqaa Valley
Shepherd Neolithic sites
Roman sites in Lebanon
Ancient Roman buildings and structures in Lebanon
Tourist attractions in Lebanon